Scopwick and Timberland railway station was a station in Scopwick, Lincolnshire, which was open between 1882 and 1955.

History

Scopwick and Timberland station closed on 7 November 1955, but the line remains open.

References

External links

Scopwick and Timberland Station on navigable 1947 O.S. map

Disused railway stations in Lincolnshire
Former Great Northern and Great Eastern Joint Railway stations
Railway stations in Great Britain opened in 1882
Railway stations in Great Britain closed in 1955